Hildebrand Lock and Dam is a navigational lock and gated dam on the Monongahela River at Hilderbrand, West Virginia.  (Hildebrand is a misspelling of Hilderbrand.)  It is part of a series of dams that canalizes the Monongahela to a depth of at least  for its entire length from Fairmont, West Virginia to Pittsburgh, Pennsylvania.  It is maintained by the U.S. Army Corps of Engineers, Pittsburgh District.

Hildebrand has a single lock chamber located on the left-descending river bank.

History
Construction on Hildebrand Lock and Dam began in 1950 and was completed in 1960.  It replaced old Locks 12 and 13, timber crib structures completed in 1903.

See also
List of crossings of the Monongahela River

References

External links
Hildebrand Lock and Dam

Transportation in Monongalia County, West Virginia
Buildings and structures in Monongalia County, West Virginia
Dams in West Virginia
Water transportation in West Virginia
Crossings of the Monongahela River
United States Army Corps of Engineers, Pittsburgh District
United States Army Corps of Engineers dams
Dams completed in 1960
Locks of West Virginia